AJ Dungo is an American surfer and illustrator known for his 2019 graphic novel In Waves. While writing In Waves, Dungo was a CMF designer for a footwear manufacturer. The book was originally an art school project about surfer Tom Blake, but expanded to include information on Duke Kahanamoku in what Surfer magazine calls "the creeping face of the commercialization of Hawaiian surf culture." While working on this project, Dungo's partner of eight years died from cancer and Dungo weaves his own grief into this surfing history book.

Dungo cites Raymond Pettibon and James Jean as early influences. His illustrations have appeared in the New York Times, Bleacher Report, and in Nike's Runner's Journal.

Dungo was born in Fort Myers, Florida and grew up in Southern California. His parents were both nurses. He has an older brother who he illustrated a story about for the New York Times. He attended ArtCenter College of Design.

References

External links
 Personal website

Living people
American graphic novelists
American comics writers
Year of birth missing (living people)